The Party of Action and Solidarity (PAS) is a liberal political party in Moldova. The PAS was founded by Maia Sandu, the former Minister of Education and the incumbent president of Moldova. A pro-European party, it is an observer of the European People's Party (EPP) and the International Democrat Union (IDU).

History

Formation 
The party was created amid the 2015–2016 protests in Moldova and growing dissatisfaction with the ruling parties among citizens. On 23 December 2015, Maia Sandu posted a YouTube video in which she announced her intention to form a new political party. Her stated reason for doing so was the creation of a grassroots party, that would function based on the principles of internal democracy and would be financed through small donations. Sandu was elected as leader of the PAS on 15 May 2016 and the party was officially registered by the Ministry of Justice on 26 May. At the time of registration, the party had 7,500 members and 20 local organizations. In February 2017, the party applied for membership of the European People's Party.

In coalition government: June 2019–November 2019 
In the 2019 Moldovan parliamentary election, the PAS and the Dignity and Truth Platform Party formed the NOW Platform electoral alliance, which gathered 26.8% of the votes. After the alliance split into two separate parliamentary groups, the PAS ended up with 15 seats. On 6 June, the Party announced that it was ready to form a coalition government with the pro-Russian Party of Socialists of the Republic of Moldova (PSRM) with the goal of freeing state institutions, which in their opinion were under oligarchic control. After the coalition was formed, PSRM leader Zinaida Greceanîi was elected as Speaker of the Parliament and the Sandu Cabinet was inaugurated. Largely because of the significant ideological differences between the ruling parties, the government only lasted for five months and was ousted on 12 November after the PSRM and the Democratic Party of Moldova voted in favor of a motion of no confidence.

In opposition: November 2019–July 2021 
After the ousting of the Sandu cabinet, the PAS has been in opposition. In the 2020 Moldovan presidential election, the party's candidate and leader Sandu was elected as President of Moldova. According to Moldovan law, the president cannot be a member of a political party which resulted in Sandu resigning from the office of party president and renouncing her party membership. Until the next party congress, the post of PAS president is held by first vice president Igor Grosu on an interim basis.

In majority government: July 2021–present 
The PAS won by a landslide during the 2021 Moldovan parliamentary election, earning them 63 seats in the parliament. Igor Grosu was elected the President of the Moldovan Parliament. On 6 August 2021, Natalia Gavrilița was voted by 61 MPs as the Prime Minister of Moldova and she became the second PAS Prime Minister of Moldova, after Maia Sandu (2019). In early 2022, the party will hold a leadership election and is also expected to nominate a candidate for the 2023 Chișinău mayoral elections.

Political positions 
The PAS has been widely described as a pro-European, centre-right party that adheres to liberalism, social liberalism, and economic liberalism.

Economic policies 
According to its program, the PAS supports the idea of an economy based on private initiative and is in favor of a significant reduction of bureaucracy in all stages of business. In the 2020 Moldovan presidential election campaign, the party's candidate Maia Sandu proposed raising the minimum pension to 2,000 lei (around 114 US dollars).

Foreign policy 
A member of the European People's Party (EPP), the PAS supports membership of Moldova in the European Union, establishing a strategic partnership with the United States, and maintaining a normal and non-confrontational relationship with Russia. The party supports strengthening Moldova's relationship with Romania but does not explicitly endorse the unification of Romania and Moldova.

Leadership 

 Igor Grosu – President; President of the Parliament
 Natalia Gavrilița – First Vice President
 Artur Mija – Secretary General; MP
 Mihai Popșoi – Vice President; Vice President of the Parliament
 Sergiu Litvinenco – Vice President
 Andrei Spînu – Vice President; Secretary-General of the Office of the President of Moldova
 Virgiliu Pîslariuc – Vice President; MP
 Dan Perciun – Vice President; MP
 Liliana Nicolaescu-Onofrei – Vice President; MP
 Radu Marian – Vice President; MP
 Olesea Stamate – Vice President; MP
 Vladimir Bolea – Vice President
 Ina Coșeru – Vice President; MP
 Doina Gherman – Vice President; MP
 Veronica Roșca – Vice President; MP
 Ion Groza – Vice President; MP
 Lilian Carp – Vice President; MP
 Adrian Băluțel – Vice President
 Larisa Voloh – Vice President; MP

Election results

Chișinău mayoral elections

Chișinău Municipal Council elections

References 

2016 establishments in Moldova
Liberal parties in Moldova
Political parties established in 2016
Pro-European political parties in Moldova